The 1994–95 season was the 71st season in the existence of AEK Athens F.C. and the 36th consecutive season in the top flight of Greek football. They competed in the Alpha Ethniki, the Greek Cup, the Greek Super Cup and the UEFA Champions League. The season began on 10 August 1994 and finished on 3 June 1995.

Overview

In the summer of 1994, AEK having won three consecutive championships and the team leaders, Melissanidis-Karras-Bajevic, decided to make a transfer excess, in an attempt to qualify for the groups of the then debut UEFA Champions League. So, despite the departure of the last season's top scorer, Alexis Alexandris for Olympiacos, there was a big transfer relapse. The "hottest" name of the domestic transfer market, Christos Kostis, the iconic Panathinaikos' player, Dimitris Saravakos, who was released by the "greens" and the Georgian Temur Ketsbaia from Anorthosis stood out among other players that were transferred to the club.

AEK were building a very good roster, but, not being able to bear the weight of the consecutive games in Greece and Europe, they soon were left behind in the league race. In the second round, the administrative uncertainty in the team returned to the spotlight, since Melissanidis-Karras faced problems in their business activities and decided to search for a buyer for the club, where they finally found in the person of Michalis Trochanas. All that had as a result that AEK were far behind in the league race early on, where they finished at fifth place, with the champion being Panathinaikos, with great ease.

AEK entered the draw of the Champions League qualifiers with moderate optimism. The draw brought them against Walter Smith's Rangers. On 10 August and while Athens was almost empty, Nikos Goumas Stadium was on fire. Saravakos took AEK by the hand and with his own personal goals made it 2–0 with AEK then maintaining the score for the rest of the match. Rangers were determined to exhaust their chances of qualification in the rematch, but in front of them they find a great AEK on a very big night. After a cross from Tsiartas, Savevski made it 1–0 at the end of the first half. From there, AEK followed an impeccable tactical approach to the game, which led to a historic victory-qualification for their first appearance in the groups of the top inter-club competition. In a very difficult group with the great Ajax of Louis van Gaal, who eventually won the trophy, the also great Milan of Fabio Capello, the eventual runners-up and Casino Salzburg, AEK finished fourth with a total of 2 draws and 4 defeats.

Having been out of the league early on, AEK placed great importance on the Cup. They easily passed the first round, coming out first in a group with Panargiakos, Atromitos, Kastoria and Ethnikos Asteras. Afterwards, they prevailed over Doxa Vyronas, then Panetolikos and in the quarter-finals he easily passed through Ethnikos Piraeus. In the semi-finals they faced Edessaikos who also they overcame with relative ease. Thus, AEK faced Panathinaikos at the Olympic Stadium on April 19, for the second consecutive season. AEK was protesting the definition of the final that stadium because according to their people it was the home ground of Panathinaikos and the opponent knew the pitch better. In order to express their protest, AEK entered the pitch alone and waited for Panathinaikos instead of the established simultaneous entrance of the opponents. Saravakos missed a penalty at the 6th minute and then a very nervous match ended 0–0. In extra time, the match was the same and everything showed that the match would be decided for the second year in a row in the penalty shootout. The referee, however, had a different opinion, attributing a penalty to Vlachos marking Warzycha at the 115th minute, a penalty which was very strongly contested by AEK and on the field there was "decimation", as players and agents of the yellow-blacks team fell on the referee of the match, as a result of which Manolas and Vlachos were expelled. At the same time, the yellow-black stands were also "boiling" and later incidents occurred outside the playing field as well. Finally Warzycha scored from the penalty spot and gave the trophy to Panathinaikos. Epilogue of the episodic final was the fact that some AEK players refuse to attend the award ceremony, while a few days after the final the referee, Filippos Bakas, was attacked by strangers.

The best players of the season for AEK are Saravakos, Savevski, Šabanadžović, Manolas, Kasapis, Atmatsidis, Tsiartas, Kostis and Dimitriadis. Top scorer of AEK and second in the league for the season, was Dimitris Saravakos with 21 goals.

Players

Squad information

NOTE: The players are the ones that have been announced by the AEK Athens' press release. No edits should be made unless a player arrival or exit is announced. Updated 30 June 1995, 23:59 UTC+3.

Transfers

In

Summer

Out

Summer

Winter

Loan out

Summer

Winter

Renewals

Overall transfer activity

Expenditure
Summer:  ₯820,000,000

Winter:  ₯0

Total:  ₯820,000,000

Income
Summer:  ₯0

Winter:  ₯0

Total:  ₯0

Net Totals
Summer:  ₯820,000,000

Winter:  ₯0

Total:  ₯820,000,000

Pre-season and friendlies

Greek Super Cup

Alpha Ethniki

League table

Results summary

Results by Matchday

Fixtures

Greek Cup

Group 1

Matches

Round of 32

Round of 16

Quarter-finals

Semi-finals

Final

UEFA Champions League

Qualifying round

Group stage

Group D

Matches

Statistics

Squad statistics

! colspan="13" style="background:#FFDE00; text-align:center" | Goalkeepers
|-

! colspan="13" style="background:#FFDE00; color:black; text-align:center;"| Defenders
|-

! colspan="13" style="background:#FFDE00; color:black; text-align:center;"| Midfielders
|-

! colspan="13" style="background:#FFDE00; color:black; text-align:center;"| Forwards
|-

! colspan="13" style="background:#FFDE00; color:black; text-align:center;"| Left during Winter Transfer Window
|-

|-
|}

Disciplinary record

|-
! colspan="20" style="background:#FFDE00; text-align:center" | Goalkeepers

|-
! colspan="20" style="background:#FFDE00; color:black; text-align:center;"| Defenders

|-
! colspan="20" style="background:#FFDE00; color:black; text-align:center;"| Midfielders

|-
! colspan="20" style="background:#FFDE00; color:black; text-align:center;"| Forwards

|-
! colspan="20" style="background:#FFDE00; color:black; text-align:center;"| Left during Winter Transfer window

|-
|}

References

External links
AEK Athens F.C. Official Website

1994–95
Greek football clubs 1994–95 season